James Howieson (7 June 1900 – 28 May 1971) was a Scottish footballer, who played as an inside forward for clubs in Scotland, Ireland, England and the United States. He earned one cap with Scotland in 1927.

Early life
Howieson, the son of a tavern owner, attended Rutherglen Elementary School and John Street School (Bridgeton, Glasgow). He spent two years as a marine engineer, but an accident led him to enlist in the Royal Navy in 1917. He spent four years as a sailor.

Playing career

Club
In 1921, Howieson purchased his release from the Navy and joined Rutherglen Glencairn. Later that year, he moved to Airdrieonians (they won the Scottish Cup during his time there and he played a part in the run, but was not involved in the final itself). In 1924, he transferred to St Johnstone. During the season, Howieson played most of St Johnstone's league games, but went on loan to St Mirren for all that team's cup games as well as a few league games. At the end of the season, he moved to Dundee United. In October 1925, Dundee United sold Howieson's contract to St Mirren for £1,000. He won the 1926 Scottish Cup with St Mirren, scoring the winning goal. In March 1927, St Mirren sent him south to Hull City for £3200.

A season later, he left the British Isles to join the New Bedford Whalers for the 1928-29 American Soccer League season. That season saw the outbreak of the "Soccer War" between the ASL and the United States Football Association over control of the sport. As part of that dispute, the USFA and FIFA declared the ASL and outlaw league and created a competing league, the Eastern Professional Soccer League. Although the Whalers remained in the ASL for most of the season, it moved to the EPSL in the spring of 1929. Howieson played thirty-five games, scoring nine goals in the ASL, then another eight games, scoring eight goals, in the EPSL. With four games left in the season, the Whalers sent Howieson to the New York Giants for four games.

At the end of the season, Howieson returned to Hull City for the 1929–30 season. In 1930, they sent him to Dublin club Shelbourne for £3200. He then played for another four teams in Scotland and Northern Ireland until his career ended in 1936.

International
On 26 February 1927, Howieson earned his lone cap in a 1–0 victory over Northern Ireland.

After football
Following his retirement, Howieson co-owned the Railway Tavern in Gorbals, Glasgow with his brother.

Honours

Club
St Mirren
Scottish Cup: 1925–26

Shelbourne
League of Ireland: 1930–31

References

External links
Scotland: James Howieson at londonhearts.com

1974 deaths
1900 births
Alloa Athletic F.C. players
American Soccer League (1921–1933) players
Airdrieonians F.C. (1878) players
Belfast Celtic F.C. players
Dundee United F.C. players
Eastern Professional Soccer League (1928–29) players
Glenavon F.C. players
Hull City A.F.C. players
New Bedford Whalers players
New York Giants (soccer) players
St Mirren F.C. players
Scottish footballers
Scottish expatriate footballers
Scotland international footballers
Association football inside forwards
Expatriate soccer players in the United States
Rutherglen Glencairn F.C. players
St Johnstone F.C. players
Shelbourne F.C. players
Clyde F.C. players
Scottish expatriate sportspeople in the United States
Sportspeople from Rutherglen
Scottish Junior Football Association players
Royal Navy sailors
British Merchant Navy personnel of World War II
Scottish expatriate sportspeople in Ireland
Expatriate association footballers in the Republic of Ireland
League of Ireland players
Scottish Football League players
NIFL Premiership players
Royal Navy personnel of World War I
Footballers from South Lanarkshire